Lycosa erythrognatha is a species of spider from the genus Lycosa. The species was originally described in 1836. It is the only spider known to feed on Rhinella ornata.

References

Spiders described in 1836
Lycosidae
Spiders of South America